Igor Vladimirovich Vekovishchev (born 6 March 1977) is a former Russian professional football player.

Club career
He played 4 seasons in the Russian Football National League for FC KAMAZ-Chally Naberezhnye Chelny and FC Metallurg Lipetsk.

References

1977 births
Footballers from Moscow
Living people
Russian footballers
Association football forwards
FC FShM Torpedo Moscow players
FC KAMAZ Naberezhnye Chelny players
FC Metallurg Lipetsk players
FC Spartak Nizhny Novgorod players